Sam Welles may refer to:
 Samuel Gardner Welles (1913–1981), American journalist
 Samuel Paul Welles (1907–1997), American palaeontologist